Checkpoint inhibitor therapy is a form of cancer immunotherapy. The therapy targets immune checkpoints, key regulators of the immune system that when stimulated can dampen the immune response to an immunologic stimulus. Some cancers can protect themselves from attack by stimulating immune checkpoint targets. Checkpoint therapy can block inhibitory checkpoints, restoring immune system function. The first anti-cancer drug targeting an immune checkpoint was ipilimumab, a CTLA4 blocker approved in the United States in 2011.

Currently approved checkpoint inhibitors target the molecules CTLA4, PD-1, and PD-L1. PD-1 is the transmembrane programmed cell death 1 protein (also called PDCD1 and CD279), which interacts with PD-L1 (PD-1 ligand 1, or CD274). PD-L1 on the cell surface binds to PD-1 on an immune cell surface, which inhibits immune cell activity. Among PD-L1 functions is a key regulatory role on T cell activities. It appears that (cancer-mediated) upregulation of PD-L1 on the cell surface may inhibit T cells that might otherwise attack. Antibodies that bind to either PD-1 or PD-L1 and therefore block the interaction may allow the T-cells to attack the tumor.

The discoveries in basic science allowing checkpoint inhibitor therapies led to James P. Allison and Tasuku Honjo winning the Tang Prize in Biopharmaceutical Science and the Nobel Prize in Physiology or Medicine in 2018.

Types

Cell surface checkpoint inhibitors

CTLA-4 inhibitors 
The first checkpoint antibody approved by the FDA was ipilimumab, approved in 2011 for treatment of melanoma. It blocks the immune checkpoint molecule CTLA-4. Clinical trials have also shown some benefits of anti-CTLA-4 therapy on lung cancer or pancreatic cancer, specifically in combination with other drugs.

However, patients treated with check-point blockade (specifically CTLA-4 blocking antibodies), or a combination of check-point blocking antibodies, are at high risk of suffering from immune-related adverse events such as dermatologic, gastrointestinal, endocrine, or hepatic autoimmune reactions. These are most likely due to the breadth of the induced T-cell activation when anti-CTLA-4 antibodies are administered by injection in the blood stream.

Using a mouse model of bladder cancer, researchers have found that a local injection of a low dose anti-CTLA-4 in the tumour area had the same tumour inhibiting capacity as when the antibody was delivered in the blood. At the same time the levels of circulating antibodies were lower, suggesting that local administration of the anti-CTLA-4 therapy might result in fewer adverse events.

PD-1 inhibitors 
Initial clinical trial results with IgG4 PD-1 antibody nivolumab (under the brand name Opdivo and developed by Bristol-Myers Squibb) were published in 2010. It was approved in 2014. Nivolumab is approved to treat melanoma, lung cancer, kidney cancer, bladder cancer, head and neck cancer, and Hodgkin's lymphoma.

 Pembrolizumab (brand name Keytruda) is another PD-1 inhibitor that was approved by the FDA in 2014 and was the second checkpoint inhibitor approved in the United States. Keytruda is approved to treat melanoma and lung cancer and is produced by Merck.
 Spartalizumab (PDR001) is a PD-1 inhibitor being developed by Novartis to treat both solid tumors and lymphomas.

PD-L1 inhibitors 

In May 2016, PD-L1 inhibitor atezolizumab was approved for treating bladder cancer.

Intracellular checkpoint inhibitors 
Other modes of enhancing [adoptive] immunotherapy include targeting so-called intrinsic checkpoint blockades. Many of these intrinsic regulators include molecules with ubiquitin ligase activity, including CBLB, and CISH.

CISH 
More recently, CISH (cytokine-inducible SH2-containing protein), another molecule with ubiquitin ligase activity, was found to be induced by T cell receptor ligation (TCR) and negatively regulate it by targeting the critical signaling intermediate PLC-gamma-1 for degradation. The deletion of CISH in effector T cells has been shown to dramatically augment TCR signaling and subsequent effector cytokine release, proliferation and survival. The adoptive transfer of tumor-specific effector T cells knocked out or knocked down for CISH resulted in a significant increase in functional avidity and long-term tumor immunity. Surprisingly there was no changes in activity of Cish's purported target, STAT5.  CISH knock out in T cells increased PD-1 expression and the adoptive transfer of CISH knock out T cells synergistically combined with PD-1 antibody blockade resulting in durable tumor regression and survival in a preclinical animal model. Thus, Cish represents a new class of T-cell intrinsic immunologic checkpoints with the potential to radically enhance adoptive immunotherapies for cancer.

Adverse effects 
Immunological adverse effects may be caused by checkpoint inhibitors. Altering checkpoint inhibition can have diverse effects on most organ systems of the body. Colitis (inflammation of the colon) occurs commonly.  The precise mechanism is unknown, but differs in some respects based on the molecule targeted. Infusion of checkpoint inhibitors has also been associated with acute seronegative myasthenia gravis. A lower incidence of hypothyroidism was observed in a trial of combined B cell depletion and immune checkpoint inhibitor treatment compared with studies of immune checkpoint inhibitor monotherapy. This holds promise for combining check point inhibitor therapy with immunosuppressive drugs to achieve anti-cancer effects with less toxicity.

Studies are beginning to show that intrinsic factors, such as species of the genus Bacteroides that inhabit the gut microbiome  prospectively modify risk of developing immune related adverse events. Further evidence of this can be found in patients that saw reversal of immune toxicity following fecal microbiome transplant from healthy donors.

See also 
 Adoptive cell transfer
 Cancer immunotherapy
 Chimeric antigen receptor
 Immune checkpoint

References 

Cancer immunotherapy
Immune system